Vikar Rasool Wani is an Indian politician from the Indian National Congress, in the state of Jammu and Kashmir. He represented Banihal Assembly constituency in the state of Jammu and Kashmir. 
He is currently serving as the President of Jammu Kashmir PCC.

References

Living people
Year of birth missing (living people)
20th-century Indian politicians
Indian National Congress politicians from Jammu and Kashmir
People from Ramban district